Daniel 'Dani' Arnaud Ndi (born 18 August 1995) is a Cameroonian footballer who plays as an attacking midfielder for CP Villarrobledo.

Club career
Born in Douala, Ndi left his homeland in 2009, aged 14, trialling in Austria and England during six months. He also had a trial period at Manchester United F.C., but nothing came of it.

Ndi subsequently joined local Daga Young Stars FC, but after a trip to Spain with Cameroon under-17s, signed for AD Colmenar Viejo. He subsequently left the club and moved to Sporting de Gijón, initially playing for lowly SD Llano 2000 due to being a non-EU player.

Ndi subsequently returned to Sporting in the 2013 summer, and made his debuts as a senior in the 2013–14 campaign, while still a youth, with the B-team in Segunda División B. In July 2014 he was called up to the main squad for the pre-season.

Ndi played his first match as a professional on 26 October 2014, replacing Miguel Ángel Guerrero in the 75th minute of a 2–0 home win against CA Osasuna in the Segunda División championship. He scored his first goal on 4 January of the following year, netting the last in a 1–1 away draw against CD Tenerife.

In April 2015, despite having one year left in his youth contract, Ndi returned to Cameroon after being advised by his agent Olivier Noah to do so, thus choosing not to return to Gijón. Noah later told Vicente González-Villamil, Ndi's representative in Spain, that he would not return to Sporting due to his low annual earnings. On 13 April, however, he returned to the club, but did not appear neither for the main squad nor the reserves during the remainder of the campaign.

On 11 November 2015, after expressing his apologies to the club and replacing his agent, Ndi extended his contract with Sporting until 2018. He made his La Liga debut seventeen days later, starting in a 1–2 away loss against Celta de Vigo. However, the club terminated his contract on 1 September 2017.

On 12 February 2018, after more than five months without a team, Ndi signed a two-season contract with RCD Mallorca in the third division. However, in July 2018, after the team promotion to the second division, Mallorca terminated his contract. 
At beginning of 2019 Ndi joined Croatian outfit NK Istra 1961 on free transfer.

At the end of November 2019, Ndi moved to CP Villarrobledo.

International career
After appearing with the under-15s and under-17s, Ndi was called up to the full side on 12 March 2015. He made his international debut on the 25th, starting and playing 75 minutes in a 1–0 friendly win against Indonesia.

Career statistics

International

References

External links
Profile at La Liga
Sporting official profile 

1995 births
Living people
Footballers from Douala
Cameroonian footballers
Association football midfielders
La Liga players
Segunda División players
Segunda División B players
Croatian Football League players
Sporting de Gijón B players
Sporting de Gijón players
RCD Mallorca players
NK Istra 1961 players
Cameroon youth international footballers
Cameroon international footballers
Cameroonian expatriate footballers
Cameroonian expatriate sportspeople in Spain
Cameroonian expatriate sportspeople in Croatia
Expatriate footballers in Spain
Expatriate footballers in Croatia